The New Way Movement is a newly formed political party in São Tomé and Príncipe. The party has been criticized by the press for its links to the far-right. 

In legislative elections held on 26 March 2006, the party won a single seat on the island of Príncipe.

Political parties in São Tomé and Príncipe
Far-right political parties